Gaziemir Air Base is an airbase of the Turkish Air Force  south of Izmir, Turkey. It is owned by the Turkish Air Force and operated by the Air Force Training Command.

The air base is the headquarters of the Air Force Training Command and hosts the training wing's 203rd Search and Rescue Squadron (Ege) with its CASA CN-235M-100 aircraft.

The foreign-language school of the Air Force is at the Gaziemir Air Base.

References

External links
 

Turkish Air Force bases
Buildings and structures in İzmir
Military in İzmir Province